Zacharias Ward (born August 31, 1970) is a Canadian actor.

Early life
Ward was born on August 31, 1970, in Toronto, Ontario, the son of actress Pam Hyatt.

Career
He is best known for his character Dave Scovil (Titus's stoner half-brother) on the FOX show Titus and as the bully Scut Farkus in the 1983 Christmas classic A Christmas Story. He has had guest roles on popular television series such as NCIS, Lost, and Crossing Jordan, and roles in films such as Almost Famous, Transformers and Anne of Green Gables. He has appeared in the horror films Resident Evil: Apocalypse and Freddy vs. Jason. Ward also has had leading roles in BloodRayne 2: Deliverance and Postal, and can be seen in Alone in the Dark II and The Devil's Tomb.

In 2014, Ward co-founded the film production company Grit Film Works with James Cullen Bressack. The first two films which he co-produced with Grit Film Works were the thriller Bethany and the horror film Restoration.

Ward is the CEO of Global Sports Financial Exchange, Inc since 2017.

On February 15, 2022, it was announced that Ward would reprise his role as Scut Farkus in the A Christmas Story sequel, A Christmas Story Christmas for Warner Bros. Pictures and HBO Max.

Personal life
On August 18, 2018, Ward married actress and producer Jennifer McMahan.

Lawsuit
In August 2011, Ward sued Warner Bros. and Enesco over merchandising for A Christmas Story after the company authorized a figure resembling his Scut Farkus character from the film without his permission. It was revealed that when he signed on to play that character, he didn't receive any merchandising rights because of a mishap with his contract. The lawsuit was dropped in January 2012 after Warner Bros. revealed that the figurine showed a "generic face" that has been used on them since 2006 and that statute of limitations had run out.

In December 2012, Ward sued Warner Bros. again over his image after attending the annual Christmas Story charity fundraiser convention in Cleveland in November 2010 after a fan handed him a Christmas Story board game, playing cards, and calendar showing his face. The lawsuit was settled three days later.

Filmography

Film

Television

Video games

References

External links
 
 

Male actors from Toronto
Canadian male child actors
Canadian male film actors
Canadian male television actors
Canadian male video game actors
Canadian male voice actors
Living people
20th-century Canadian male actors
21st-century Canadian male actors
1970 births
Canadian people of American descent